Thomas Reese may refer to:

 Thomas J. Reese (born 1945), Jesuit priest and journalist
 Thomas S. Reese, neuroscientist, member of the National Academy of Sciences
 Tom Reese (1867–1949), New Zealand cricketer